The Appaloosa bean is a cultivar bean variety of the species Phaseolus vulgaris.

Seed and plant characteristics
The pods can be eaten as a fresh green bean. Front portion of the bean is ivory colored; the other end is speckled with purple and mocha. The bean is named after the Appaloosa ponies of the Nez Perce tribe. The seed was cultivated near the Palouse River in Eastern Washington & Northern Idaho. With similarities to the pinto bean, some attribute the bean to like the New Mexican Appaloosa, which is actually a different variety of bean.

References

edible legumes
Phaseolus